Ostap Dashkevych (Ukrainian: Остап Дашкевич; born in Ovruch – died after 1535) is considered to be the first recorded leader of a Cossack defense force (according to Dmitri Bantysh-Kamensky, Dmytro Doroshenko, and others). However that claim of "first" is debatable because there were many other early leaders, including Bohdan Glinski from Severia and Dmytro Vyshnevetsky.

Dashkevych held a position of starosta in Cherkasy (1514–35) at the early stages of development of cossacks and is sometimes mistakenly referred to as a hetman. Some sources as well as oral tradition claim that Dashkevych lived past the age of 80, at which age he routed the Tatars at Cherkasy.

Origin

The information about his origin is very scarce. The Polish poet from Kyiv region Józef Bohdan Zaleski in the foreword of his duma "Out of the Savur's Grave or duma about the first hetman" wrote that in his childhood he heard stories about Daszko Wisnowecki who lived on the Knyahynia [Princess] island just south of Kodak. According to the folk tale, the prince perished in his youth leaving on the island his wife (supposedly of Polish origin) and his son who eventually became a glorious Cossack hetman. Zaleski suggests that Ostap Dashkevych was a son of Daszko Wisnowecki. In his opinion, the origin of Dashkevych from the Princes Wisnoweckis could be confirmed as Ostap Dashkevych has the same family coat of arms. According to Seweryn Uruski, a Polish heraldry specialist, Dashkevych belonged to the Leliwa coat of arms.

Ostap Dashkevych of Orthodox Christian religion, he was presumably a descendant of Rurikid and Gengisid from Ovruch. Dashkevych also became known as a founder of Zaporizhian Host. He donated his lands near Kyiv to the Church of Resurrection of Christ at Podil in Kyiv. His estate eventually transformed into the village of Voskresenska Slobidka and later gave a name to the Voskresenka neighborhood which is now a part of modern Kyiv on the left bank of Dnieper.

Dashkevych was considered the highest authority in Lithuania on the Tatar question. His campaigns sometimes took him as far as Crimea. However, in 1515 and 1521, while in alliance with the Tatars, he organized campaigns against the Grand Duchy to assist Lithuania. For some of his wars see Crimean-Nogai Raids, years 1515-1531.

He took part in the 1507 uprising of Michael Glinski against King Zygmunt I the Old. In 1514, he became the starosta of both Kaniv and Cherkasy.

Dashkevych was an effective leader. He took a major role in not only organizing Cossack forces to defend Ukraine but also in organizing offensive campaigns against the Turks and Tatars. In Piotrków in 1533, he gave his plan to the Sejm, recommending that the government of the Polish–Lithuanian Commonwealth organize the Cossacks as a standing military force for the defense of Ukraine, which at the time made up the southern border of the Commonwealth. His plan was approved, but the Commonwealth provided no assistance.

Impact 
Ostap Dashkevych made a great impact on the organization of the Ukrainian Cossack Army and the Ukrainian State. He is a prominent descendant of prince Rurik and Genghis Khan of the Mongol Empire, one of the first cossack otamans, which organized different troops of people of Ukraine of that time who identified as cossacks, into one military and political force, making it possible to defend the lives, freedoms, and rights of native people of Ukraine, who mostly were of Orthodox Christian faith and Ukrainian language, and therefore oppressed by the governments and military forces of surrounding countries.

In literature
Dashkevych's successful rout of the Crimean Tatars' attempt to sack Cherkasy is commemorated in Tomasz Padura's ballad "Duma Rycerska".

See also
 List of Ukrainian rulers
 Registry cossacks
 Cossack Hetmanate
 Cossack with musket

References 

 Dmytro Doroshenko, A Survey of Ukrainian History, ed. Oleh Gerus (Winnipeg, 1975).
 Ostafii Dashkevych at Encyclopedia of Ukraine
 Handbook on the History of Ukraine
 

1450s births
1530s deaths
People from Ovruch
Diplomats of the Polish–Lithuanian Commonwealth
Zaporozhian Cossack nobility

Year of birth uncertain
Year of death uncertain